The women's 1500 metres event at the 2007 Summer Universiade was held on 9–12 August.

Medalists

Results

Heats
Qualification: First 4 of each heat (Q) and the next 4 fastest (q) qualified for the final.

Final

References
Results

1500
2007 in women's athletics
2007